Margaret Storrs Grierson (June 29, 1900 – December 12, 1997) was an American archivist, philosophy professor, and the founder and first director of the Sophia Smith Collection at Smith College.  In this capacity, she traveled extensively, in the United States and abroad, assembling manuscripts that document the history of women.

Personal life
Grierson was born in Denver, Colorado.  Her father was railway executive Lucius Seymour Storrs and her mother was Mary Cooper Storrs, daughter of Job Adams Cooper, sixth Governor of the State of Colorado. Grierson had one sibling, a brother, Lucius ("Luke") Seymour Storrs, Jr.

Because of her father's career, the family moved several times during Grierson's childhood.  She attended seven schools before entering Misses Masters' School, Dobbs Ferry, New York.

In 1918 Grierson began her undergraduate study at Smith College. She graduated in 1922 with a degree in English. She then did graduate work at Bryn Mawr, receiving a Ph.D. in philosophy in 1930. From 1924 to 1925 she studied at University College of the University of London.

During her subsequent professional years at Smith, Grierson developed an enduring friendship with professor Marine Leland that lasted until Leland's death in 1983. In the mid 1930s the two women purchased a home together at 66 Massasoit Street in Northampton. They shared the home even after Grierson's marriage on December 7, 1938.

Grierson's husband was Sir Herbert Grierson, Rector of the University of Edinburgh. She married him in Edinburgh, Scotland. They returned to Northampton in February 1939. Sir Herbert died in February 1960.

In the early 1990s Grierson sold the home she had shared with Leland and moved to an apartment on Crescent Street.

Grierson died of cancer on December 12, 1997 in Leeds, Massachusetts.

Career
Grierson taught philosophy at Smith College from 1930 to 1936.  In 1940, she became the college archivist, and in 1942, she also became the executive secretary of the Friends of the Smith College Library. In 1942, she became the first director of the Sophia Smith Collection at the college. Until her retirement in 1965, Grierson simultaneously held the three positions.

After her retirement, Grierson shifted her attention to family ancestry, focusing on the Cooper, Rankin, and Barnes families.

She was awarded the Smith College Medal in 1968.

Legacy
The Grierson Scholars program was launched in the late 1990s, partially funded by the National Endowment for the Humanities.

References

External links
 Article, Smith College

1900 births
1997 deaths
People from Denver
American archivists
Female archivists
Smith College alumni
Bryn Mawr College alumni
Smith College faculty